Arthur Dempster may refer to:

Arthur Jeffrey Dempster (1886–1950), physicist at the University of Chicago and Manhattan Project participant
Arthur P. Dempster (born 1929), mathematician and statistician at Harvard University